Zorzinichthys is an extinct genus of fish from the Ypresian age of Monte Bolca.

References

External links

Eocene fish
Eocene fish of Europe
Fossils of Italy
Prehistoric ray-finned fish genera